Thunderhill Raceway Park is a motorsports complex located 7 miles West of Willows, California, United States, in the Sacramento Valley. It is the venue for the longest automobile race in the United States, the 25 Hours of Thunderhill, held annually during the first weekend in December.

Thunderhill has two tracks: the original 3 mile track known as Thunderhill East and a 2-mile track known as Thunderhill West. The two tracks can also be combined to offer a 5-mile track, the longest road course in America. Thunderhill also offers two large skid pad areas as well for drifting and car control events.

The venue is available for a wide variety of events or functions. It can be rented for racing events, lapping day events, drifting events, go kart events, driving schools, ride and drive programs, corporate events, commercials, a movie location, trade shows, weddings, receptions, swap meets etc.

San Francisco Region Properties, Inc., dba Thunderhill Park is the wholly owned subsidiary of the San Francisco Region Sports Car Club of America. Thunderhill Raceway has its own board of directors and is operated completely independently of the non-profit subsidiary.

History

Thunderhill Raceway Park was built in 1993 originally as a 1.9 mile long, 9 turn track. Following the closure of the Baylands Raceway in Fremont, CA, the purchase of the land and construction of Thunderhill was funded by the San Francisco Region Sports Car Club of America.

In late 1997, the track was expanded to its present-day 3 mile configuration, adding six new turns, a bypass for the "cyclone" corner, and additional paved paddock space.

Thunderhill West was conceptualized in 2013 and built in 2014 as a standalone track. Connectors were made to connect the original track with the new west track to make a five mile-long track. At the time of construction, this was the longest racetrack in California, and it gained the nickname "Thunderschleife" as a nod to the Nurburgring Nordschleife.

References

External links
Thunderhill Park Official Site
25-Hours of Thunderhill Official Site
American Federation of Motorcyclists (AFM) Official Site
NASA National Auto Sport Association Official Site
1tail Resource Database - Thunderhill Raceway Park

Buildings and structures in Glenn County, California
Motorsport venues in California
Willows, California
Tourist attractions in Glenn County, California
Road courses in the United States